"Harry Hippie" is a 1972 song written by Jim Ford, who wrote it for singer Bobby Womack as a dedication to his brother, bass guitarist Harry Womack.

Background
The song was loosely based on Bobby's brother's carefree behavior and was originally recorded as a funny tribute to his brother, that turned tragic when Harry Womack was killed by his girlfriend during a fight in 1974. From then on until his death, Bobby Womack sung the song as a dedication to his fallen late brother.

Womack explains the story behind the song and its aftermath:

Chart performance
The song was  a top-10 R&B hit for Womack when issued as a single in 1973, reaching number eight on the chart, and was Womack's second top-40 hit on the Billboard Hot 100 peaking at number 31 on the chart.

References

External links 
 Rita Lorraine, "Harry Hippie – Bobby Womack", The Black History Channel, February 6, 2016.

1972 songs
1973 singles
Bobby Womack songs
Song recordings produced by Bobby Womack